Oh My God, Charlie Darwin is the third studio album by American band the Low Anthem. It was self-published on September 2, 2008, and re-issued by Bella Union and Nonesuch Records in June 2009. Following the success of their album What the Crow Brings (2007), founding members Ben Knox Miller and Jeffrey Prystowsky welcomed Jocie Adams to the band. They were inspired by the confidence and romanticism of John Steinbeck's novels, and found tension between the human requirement of comfort and Charles Darwin's bleak theories of Darwinism, using his theory of natural selection as a framework to consider academics, politics, and religion. The album is named after Darwin, as the group considered how jarring his "survival of the fittest" theory would seem to a person of faith.

The album was recorded in the first ten days of 2008 in a basement in Block Island, Rhode Island, which was transformed into a temporary recording studio. The band enlisted Jesse Lauter to co-produce the album. The Americana sound is accompanied by several other genres, such as blues, country, folk, gospel, and R&B. It opens with quiet songs in Miller's falsetto and modal voice, followed by louder and chaotic tracks, before returning to more solemn music. The album incorporates at least 27 instruments, including crotales, pump organ, and zither. Some songs evolved extensively during recording, with several different approaches to tempo and instrumentation. The album consists of twelve tracks, one of which is a cover of a Tom Waits song written by Jack Kerouac.

The album was supported by two singles: "Charlie Darwin" in September 2009, and "To the Ghosts Who Write History Books" in February 2010. After the album's release, the Low Anthem embarked on a tour of the United States from 2008, and added Canada and Europe to its touring roster in 2009, followed by their first North American headline tour in 2010. Word-of-mouth support boosted the album's popularity; it charted in Belgium and the Netherlands, and sold 75,000 copies worldwide. Critics praised Oh My God, Charlie Darwin for its lyrics, themes, and vocals but a few questioned the necessity and intensity of the louder songs. At the Boston Music Awards, the Low Anthem and Oh My God, Charlie Darwin won Best New Act and Album of the Year, respectively. Various publications listed it as one of the best albums of the year.

Recording and production 

The Low Anthem founding members Ben Knox Miller and Jeffrey Prystowsky felt ambitious after the success of their second studio album, What the Crow Brings (2007), which sold over 10,000 copies. In November 2007, they welcomed to the group Jocie Adams, a classical composer and former NASA technician who they knew from Brown University; she had been a fan since they started performing live. Miller realized they should take elements from their musical influences and blend them with more modern themes. The band re-read John Steinbeck's East of Eden (1952) while writing and recording the album, inspired by the confidence, beauty, and romanticism of Steinbeck's writing style; they taped the word timshel, featured prominently in East of Eden, above the control booth. The name of the album, Oh My God, Charlie Darwin, occurred to the group while observing giraffes at the Roger Williams Park Zoo in their home town of Providence, Rhode Island. They discussed how jarring Charles Darwin's theories of "survival of the fittest" would seem to a person of faith and kept repeating the phrase "Oh my God! Charlie Darwin!" to each other.

The group realized the theme of Darwinism echoed throughout their previous work. While writing the songs, they found a tension between the human requirement of comfort and the bleak theory of Darwinism. They kept a copy of Darwin's On the Origin of Species (1859) around during production. Miller often used the theory of natural selection as a framework to consider academics, politics, and religion, likening ideas being in competition just as genes are. He found the album a recognition of religion—particularly Christianity—spreading its message as animals spread their genes. Miller stated he is not antireligious and the group did not take sides between religion and Darwinism; he felt the album was about both hope and hopelessness, and described it as "a gospel record for scientists and social philosophers". He viewed it as a book, with each of the songs "leaning on each other", while producer Jesse Lauter wanted it to imitate a movie. Miller felt it had a "better live feel" than What the Crow Brings since the latter's basic production prohibited experimentation. While What the Crow Brings focused on quiet Americana, Oh My God, Charlie Darwin added some variation such as rock and roll, which Miller felt allowed a more consistent theme.

To record the album, the band and some friends traveled by ferry to Block Island, Rhode Island, where they transformed the basement of Miller's parents' house into a temporary recording studio while they were away; eleven people lived together in isolation, which Miller felt lent a utopian atmosphere that suited the album, leading to friction and tension and resulting in better music. He found the starkness and space of Block Island representative of the album; its population sits around 800 in the winter months. Lauter—then a student at the Clive Davis Department of Recorded Music—brought high-quality equipment from his classmates. Prystowsky appreciated Lauter's contributions as he was "a little less emotionally invested" than the band members, and Miller felt he pushed them further than they did. Recording began on January 1, 2008, and took ten days. The album uses at least 27 instruments, including banjo, crotales, harmonica, pump organ, and zither. Additional recording took place at Adorea Recording Studio with Travis Bell in Hamden, Connecticut, and at Oestern Studio in Williamsburg, New York, followed by overdubs and recording at Lauter's apartment in Harlem, New York.

The songs had been written some time before recording. As the group's primary songwriter, Miller would approach the other members with lyrics and a melody and they would collaborate to create the arrangement. Some songs were arranged almost instantly while writing, while others evolved significantly during production. After 40 takes of "Charlie Darwin", the band realized they could extensively change the song, and it took from 60 to over 100 takes to finalize; Miller recalled the 85th take was the best. "Cage the Songbird" and "Charlie Darwin" were among the final songs recorded; the band attempted several approaches to tempo and instrumentation but eventually settled on raising the vocals an octave to give a choral quality, and removing the drums from the latter song. "Home I'll Never Be" is a cover of Tom Waits's version of the song from Orphans: Brawlers, Bawlers & Bastards (2006), itself a cover of Jack Kerouac's "On the Road" from Jack Kerouac Reads On the Road (1999). The group did not intend to include the song, but found its inclusion necessary after performing it in one take during pre-production.

Music and lyrics 

While Oh My God, Charlie Darwin is largely recognized as Americana, it is sometimes referred to as indie folk, indie rock, or neofolk, and its music spans genres such as blues, country, folk, gospel, and R&B. The album invokes themes of redemption, apocalypse, life and death, love, and religion; it has been compared to the antediluvian period and the works resulting from the Dust Bowl, and considered an unintentional mirror of the economic woes of the United States, as well as a loss of free debate during and after the presidency of George W. Bush. Miller said it is about "environmental decay and social de-evolution and the death of morality". The album opens with quiet songs followed by louder and chaotic tracks, and closes with more solemn music. Bookending the album, "Charlie Darwin" and "To Ohio (Reprise)" respectively set and reiterate its eclectic tone with gentle music. Miller sings in falsetto in "Charlie Darwin" and modal voice in "To Ohio" and "Ticket Taker", before dropping to a "growling low" by "The Horizon is a Beltway".

The lyrics of "Charlie Darwin" juxtapose the hope of the Mayflowers voyage with the brutality of manifest destiny and the diseases it introduced to Native Americans. Aquarium Drunkards Mik Davis observed the song "laments being on a voyage and how even the brightest promise can be dimmed by directionlessness". Pastes Josh Jackson viewed it an attack on society's application of Darwinism, while Uncuts Allan Jones said it "imagines a drowning world, returned to water, a few sodden souls cast adrift on a sea of sorrow". Stevie Chick of The Guardian described the song as "lachrymose and haunting", and John Fortunato of The Aquarian wrote "Miller's trembled quiver stirringly haunts stripped-down meditational ruminations". Miller compared it to chamber and choral music. PopMatterss D.M. Edwards found the vocals of "Charlie Darwin" and "To Ohio" gentle and "breezy... melding together, floating away, and carrying warnings of decline". DIYs Erik Thompson felt the opening tracks set a tone of warmth and intimacy that carries the album.

"To Ohio" is about yearning for lost love and new scenery. The Aquarians Fortunato likened the atmosphere of "To Ohio" and "(Don't) Tremble" to the works of Nick Drake, emphasized by the variety of instruments against Miller's "solitary grief-stricken hymnals"; Uncuts Jones compared the former to Paul Simon, and considered the latter a pledge of loyalty and hymn of reassurance. Miller wrote "(Don't) Tremble" for a former band member who was consistently insecure about his work. WXPN's Bruce Warren felt "To Ohio" showcased the band's "soft and tender side", and The Quietuss Tom Milway likened its imagery to a Steinbeck novel. "Ticket Taker" was described by Fortunato as "poignant muzzle-voiced maunder" bedeviled by desperation, and by Gigwises Huw Jones as a love story recounting biblical floods. DIYs Thompson felt it alluded to the responsibility of guiding others through difficult lives. Several tracks have been compared to the work of other artists: "Charlie Darwin" to Fleet Foxes, "Ticket Taker" to Leonard Cohen, and "The Horizon is a Beltway" to Tom Waits, Bob Dylan, and The Pogues. Uncuts Jones wrote "The Horizon is a Beltway" envisioned catastrophe in its images of burning skylines and rotting flesh. The Aquarians Fortunato described "Cage the Songbird" as a threnody reminiscent of the Cowboy Junkies, while the BBC's Jon Lusk identified a similarity to the lullaby "Hush, Little Baby" with its list of conditionals.

"Champion Angel" is the longest and loudest track, utilizing electric guitars, drums, and roaring vocals. The Aquarians Fortunato considered it a reinterpretation of Delta blues, comparing it to the Black Keys, North Mississippi Allstars, and early Kings of Leon, while NMEs Leonie Cooper compared it to Tom Petty. Fortunato likened "OMGCD" to country and Western music like "Will the Circle Be Unbroken", while Leahey compared it to gospel music. Ed Miller of Drowned in Sound identified the track listing as a "tapestry of American iconography": the first settlers in "Charlie Darwin", Midwest in "To Ohio", the "hobo spirit" of "Home I'll Never Be", and "a wild romantic heart" overall. The fiddle was played by Anna Williams and Cameron Orr on "The Horizon is a Beltway", and by Williams on "To Ohio (Reprise)". Graham Smith played the singing bowl on "Charlie Darwin". Lauter produced and engineered the album; Travis Bell provided some additional engineering. The album was mixed by Brian Taylor over seven days. For recording, the group used two microphone preamplifiers by PreSonus, connected through lightpipe to a Digi002 running Pro Tools. An Electro-Voice RE20 was used to record vocals, connected to a Universal Audio preamplifier. "To Ohio" and "Cage the Songbird" use a portable pump organ by Estey Organ.

Release and promotion 

The Low Anthem self-published Oh My God, Charlie Darwin on September 2, 2008. The popularity was largely attributed to word-of-mouth support; Miller said the band was able to "make a living" by March 2009. The album sold 75,000 copies worldwide by February 2011, and What the Crow Brings and Oh My God, Charlie Darwin had sold a combined 100,000 copies by January 2018. It was reissued by Nonesuch Records in the United States on June 9, 2009, and by Bella Union in the United Kingdom on June 15, 2009. Bob Ludwig mastered the reissue. The group signed with Nonesuch in April 2009 as they respected its roster. The album was supported by two singles: "Charlie Darwin" on September 28, 2009, and "To the Ghosts Who Write History Books" on February 15, 2010. A music video for "Charlie Darwin" was released exclusively by Stereogum in October 2009; the stop-motion animated video was produced by Glenn Taunton and Simon Taffe in a studio in Sussex. The video's release was a culminating point for the marketing campaign; it was one of Stereogums most commented-on videos. A limited edition version of "Charlie Darwin" was released as a seven-inch vinyl record on March 23, 2010, with two additional tracks.

The Low Anthem performed songs from the album on the radio show Radcliffe & Maconie on September 30, 2009. They made their British television debut on November 20, 2009, performing "To Ohio" on Later... with Jools Holland, and their American debut on January 14, 2010, performing "Charlie Darwin" on the Late Show with David Letterman. The band's manager, Kate Landau, had been talking to the production team of the latter for around eight months and felt the success of the "Charlie Darwin" music video secured their booking. Tom Jones released a cover of "Charlie Darwin" in his 2012 album Spirit in the Room, and the original song was featured in the conclusion of "Charlie Darwin", the third episode of Rectifys second season on July 3, 2014. The Low Anthem issued limited edition pressings of the album on vinyl for its tenth anniversary: Joyful Noise Recordings published 1,000 hand-numbered pressings in a jacket painted by the band alongside a flexi disc with two additional songs and a digital version on November 15, 2019, and Dinked published 300 pressings in a screen-printed jacket on November 29, 2019. The group toured across Europe and the United States to celebrate the reissue.

The band toured 30 locations in the United States after the album's release in 2008 and 2009, including appearances at the Bonnaroo Music Festival, Falcon Ridge Folk Festival, and South by Southwest, joining performers such as Ray LaMontagne, Joe Pug, and Josh Ritter. Following their signing with Nonesuch, they debuted in Europe in May 2009, touring in France, Ireland, the Netherlands, and the United Kingdom, and spent five months touring between Europe and the United States, including at the Glastonbury Festival in June and Lollapalooza in August. Following a month-long European stint in September, they added 21 locations to their American tour in October and November—including their West Coast debut—and ended the year with two London shows in November. In January 2010, the band performed at the Abrons Arts Center, and for Mountain Stage and Tiny Desk Concerts. They toured 13 European shows in January and February, followed by a ten-city North American tour with the Avett Brothers in February and March. To support the album, the band began their first headline tour on March 11 in Washington, D.C., followed by several shows across North America in March and April, including South by Southwest. They played several festivals in Europe and the United States from July to September, including Electric Picnic, Haldern Pop, Newport Folk Festival, and Summer Sundae.

Critical reception 

Oh My God, Charlie Darwin received positive reviews from critics. Review aggregator Metacritic assigned an average review score of 80 out of 100, indicating "generally favorable reviews", based on 18 critics, and AnyDecentMusic? assigned a score of 6.8/10 based on 10 reviews. The album was described by Pastes Jackson as "exquisite", and by NMEs Leonie Cooper as a "welcome addition to the intricate patchwork quilt of the new wave of Americana"; Ottawa Citizens Stuart Derdeyn found the group unique within a debased genre. PopMatterss Edwards called the album "nuanced, prescient, melodic, and stirring", and Under the Radars Laura Leebove concluded it "flawlessly balances heartfelt warbles with gritty countryside wails". MusicOMHs Darren Lee considered it among the best albums of the first half of 2009, and called "Charlie Darwin" among the year's best songs "with its ability to send a chill down the spine", a sentiment echoed by Fort Worth Star-Telegrams Preston Jones, who felt Miller's vocals anchored the track but the album was unable to recapture its power.

Iain Shedden of The Australian commended the album's variety and the band's ability to handle different genres and themes. AllMusics Andrew Leahey echoed this sentiment and praised Miller's vocals, particularly on "Charlie Darwin" and "Cage the Songbird". DIYs Thompson lauded Lauter's production for the diversity of sounds and instrumentation, while Gigwises Jones described the album as "an agnostic mix of startling beauty and haunting comment" and enjoyed its fusion of genres. The Independents Andy Gill observed Miller's quiet vocals were best employed on "Ticket Taker" and "(Don't) Tremble". Uncuts Jones found the former the standout but the reprise of "To Ohio" superfluous due to the perfection of the original, which he considered the only misjudgment on a nearly perfect album; conversely, The Sunday Timess Mark Edwards regarded the reprise demonstrative of the band's high ability in that they can rework even their own music. BBC's Lusk cited "The Horizon is a Beltway" as the only weakness due to its interruption of the quiet opening tracks, but otherwise felt the album surpasses its influences through lyrical imagery and strong melodies.

The Austin Chronicles Doug Freeman found the track sequencing emphasized the band's variety of talent and noted the album achieves "the balance of apocalypse and subtlety" that artists like the Avett Brothers and Felice Brothers were unable to achieve. Ed Miller of Drowned in Sound wrote the album had the potential to fail, but its consistent quality, philosophical lyrics, and experimental music made it compelling. The Boston Globes Jonathan Perry similarly lauded its exploration of themes. Rolling Stones Christian Hoard criticized some lyrics of "Charlie Darwin" but praised "Cage the Songbird" and "The Horizon is a Beltway" as the album's best. The Observers Killian Fox praised the writing but considered the music "only sporadically engaging", while The Quietuss Milway found the tracks "dull and fictional"—the exception being "Charlie Darwin"—and criticized the uninteresting lyrics, imitation of existing music, superfluous instruments, and lack of falsetto after the opening track.

Several reviewers enjoyed the quiet, sombre tracks more than the upbeat, louder songs; Kati Schardl of the Tallahassee Democrat appreciated the latter but found the former more moving and engaging, while Jon Pareles of The New York Times lauded "To Ohio" and "(Don't) Tremble" but thought the upbeat songs emulated Tom Waits. Evening Standards Pete Clark observed quiet tracks like "To Ohio" fit neatly with loud songs like "The Horizon is a Beltway". The Irish Timess Lauren Murphy similarly felt both styles were cleverly connected by poetic lyrics but noted a preference for the quieter moments. Steven Hyden of The A.V. Club praised the intimacy of songs like "(Don't) Tremble" but felt additional less-serious songs like "Champion Angel" may have improved the album. Conversely, The Line of Best Fits Simon Tyers found "Champion Angel" too unfamiliar and detracted from the slow burn, and The Guardians Dave Simpson noted the louder tracks felt like a different genre. Hot Presss Edwin McFee wrote the album "succeeds because of its sincerity" but considered tracks like "The Horizon is a Beltway" unnecessary.

Charts and accolades 
Oh My God, Charlie Darwin charted in Belgium for eleven weeks from July to September 2009, peaking at 32nd in the second week, and it charted 89th in the Netherlands in July. The Low Anthem won Best New Act at the 21st Boston Music Awards in December 2008. At the 22nd Boston Music Awards the following year, Oh My God, Charlie Darwin won Album of the Year, while the Low Anthem and "The Horizon is a Beltway" were nominated for Act of the Year and Best Song of the Year, respectively. The Low Anthem placed third for the Uncut Music Award in 2009. Oh My God, Charlie Darwin was ranked 18th on Pastes list of 2008 albums, and WFUV's Vin Scelsa listed among his favorite albums of the year. Following its reissue, it appeared on multiple publications' and personalities' year-end lists of 2009, including Magnet (1st), HUMO (2nd), Ottawa Citizen (3rd), Brattleboro Reformer (4th), Paste (4th), Steve McCoy (5th), Billings Gazette (9th), Mojo (12th), The Huffington Post (tied 17th), Uncut (21st), Q (22nd), MusicOMH (30th), The Guardian (41st), WOXY.com (97th), Boston Herald, and The Independent.

Track listing

Notes

References 

2008 albums
Bella Union albums
Americana albums
Nonesuch Records albums
Self-released albums
The Low Anthem albums